

England

Head coach: Dick Greenwood

 Steve Bainbridge
 Bryan Barley
 Phil Blakeway
 John Carleton
 Maurice Colclough
 David Cooke
 Les Cusworth
 Huw Davies
 Andy Dun
 Jon Hall
 Dusty Hare
 Gary Pearce
 Paul Rendall
 John Scott
 Paul Simpson
 Mike Slemen
 Rory Underwood
 Colin White
 Peter Wheeler (c.)
 Peter Winterbottom
 Clive Woodward
 Nick Youngs

France

Head coach: Jacques Fouroux

 Jacques Begu
 Serge Blanco
 Didier Codorniou
 Jean Condom
 Michel Cremaschi
 Philippe Dintrans
 Pierre Dospital
 Daniel Dubroca
 Dominique Erbani
 Patrick Estève
 Jérôme Gallion
 Jean-Pierre Garuet-Lempirou
 Francis Haget
 Jean-Luc Joinel
 Patrice Lagisquet
 Jean-Patrick Lescarboura
 Alain Lorieux
 Jean-Charles Orso
 Jean-Pierre Rives (c.)
 Laurent Rodriguez
 Philippe Sella

Ireland

Head coach: Willie John McBride

 Ollie Campbell
 Hugh Condon
 Keith Crossan
 Tony Doyle
 Willie Duggan (c.)*
 William Duncan
 Ciaran Fitzgerald (c.)
 Des Fitzgerald
 Harry Harbison
 David Irwin
 Moss Keane
 Michael Kiernan
 Donal Lenihan
 Hugo MacNeill
 J. J. McCoy
 Derek McGrath
 Robbie McGrath
 Ginger McLoughlin
 Rory Moroney
 John Murphy
 John O'Driscoll
 Phil Orr
 Trevor Ringland
 Fergus Slattery
 Tony Ward

*captain in the first two games

Scotland

Head coach: Jim Telfer

 Jim Aitken (c.)
 Roger Baird
 Jim Calder
 Alister Campbell
 Bill Cuthbertson
 Colin Deans
 Peter Dods
 Gordon Hunter
 David Johnston
 Euan Kennedy
 Roy Laidlaw
 David Leslie
 Iain Milne
 Steve Munro
 Iain Paxton
 Jim Pollock
 Keith Robertson
 John Rutherford
 Alan Tomes

Wales

Head coach: John Bevan

 Rob Ackerman
 Bleddyn Bowen
 Eddie Butler (c.)*
 Malcolm Dacey
 Howell Davies
 Mark Douglas
 Ian Eidman
 Adrian Hadley
 Terry Holmes
 Billy James
 Staff Jones
 Rhys Morgan
 Dick Moriarty
 Bob Norster
 John Perkins
 Dai Pickering
 Ian Stephens
 Mark Titley
 Mike Watkins (c.)**

External links
1984 Five Nations Championship Statistics

Six Nations Championship squads